GelRed is an intercalating nucleic acid stain used in molecular genetics for agarose gel DNA electrophoresis. GelRed structurally consists of two ethidium subunits that are bridged by a linear oxygenated spacer.

GelRed is a fluorophore, and its optical properties are essentially identical to those of ethidium bromide. When exposed to ultraviolet light, it fluoresces with an orange color that strongly intensifies after binding to DNA. The substance is marketed as a less toxic and more sensitive alternative to ethidium bromide. GelRed is sold as a solution in anhydrous DMSO or ultrapurified water. GelRed is unable to cross cell membranes.

See also 

 Ethidium bromide
 GelGreen
 SYBR Green I
 Gel electrophoresis
 Phenanthridine
 Molecular genetics

References 

Aromatic amines
Iodides
DNA-binding substances
Carboxamides
Quaternary ammonium compounds
Phenanthridine dyes
Staining dyes